Ted Glossop (1934 – 31 December 1998) was an Australian rugby league footballer and coach.

Playing career
He played for the St. George Dragons for eight seasons between 1950 and 1958 and played 115 games for the club scoring 17 tries. He retired after the 1958 Third Grade grand final.

Club and state coaching career
He then went on to become a first-grade coach with Cronulla-Sutherland, a Premiership-winning coach with Canterbury-Bankstown in the 1980 NSWRFL season and lastly he coached St. George to a victory in the 1988 Panasonic Cup.

Glossop is also remembered as the inaugural coach of the New South Wales State of Origin team from 1980 to 1981, being (replaced by Frank Stanton in 1982) and returning for the 1983 series.

Personal life
His son, John Glossop, was a first grade player with the Cronulla-Sutherland Sharks (1975-1983).

Glossop was also a high school teacher and principal. He was promoted from deputy principal at Gymea High School to principal of Picnic Point High School in 1979. He returned to Gymea High School as principal in the late 1980s. As a student he attended Canterbury Boys' High School.

Death
Glossop died after losing a battle with cancer in 1998.

References

1934 births
1998 deaths
Australian rugby league coaches
Australian rugby league players
Canterbury-Bankstown Bulldogs coaches
Cronulla-Sutherland Sharks coaches
Date of birth missing
New South Wales Rugby League State of Origin coaches
People educated at Canterbury Boys' High School
Rugby league halfbacks
Rugby league players from Sydney
St. George Dragons coaches
St. George Dragons players
 deaths from cancer in New South Wales